Paul Stalder (20 January 1930 – 7 May 2014) was a Swiss sprinter. He competed in the men's 4 × 400 metres relay at the 1952 Summer Olympics.

References

External links
  

1930 births
2014 deaths
Athletes (track and field) at the 1952 Summer Olympics
Swiss male sprinters
Olympic athletes of Switzerland
Place of birth missing